Route 245 is a short north/south highway on the south shore of the Saint Lawrence River in the Estrie region of Quebec. It links Eastman at the junction of Route 112 and the hamlet of South Bolton, in Bolton-Est, at the junction of Route 243. It is known as Rue Lapointe ("Lapointe Street") in Eastman, becoming Route Missisquoi ("Missisquoi Road") as it crosses over in Bolton-Est.

Municipalities along Route 245
 Bolton-Est
 Eastman

See also
 List of Quebec provincial highways

References

External links 
 Provincial Route Map (Courtesy of the Quebec Ministry of Transportation) 
 Route 245 on Google Maps

245